Boris Sokolov (born January 2, 1957, in Moscow), is a historian and a Russian literature researcher (he a has Candidate of Science degree in History and Habilitat Doctor of Science in Philology). In 1979 he graduated from the department of geography of the Moscow State University, specialising in economic geography. His works have been translated into Japanese, Polish, Latvian and Estonian. He has also translated literary works from various languages.

During Soviet times, he worked at the Institute of World Literature. Subsequently, he served as a professor of social anthropology at Russian State Social University. In September 2008 he had to resign under pressure of the Administration of then-President Dmitrij Medvedev. After publishing the article 'Did Saakashvili lose?', he wrote numerous monographs, e.g. on Gogol, Sergei Esenin, and Mikhail Bulgakov (Sokolov was the author of the Bulgakov Encyclopedia, published in 1996).

From the 1990s onwards, he has turned to subjects on Russian 20th century history, publishing studies on Lavrentiy Beria, Joseph Stalin, Vyacheslav Molotov and Leonid Brezhnev. He is one of the Russian historians alongside those who are critically reviewing the part of the Soviet Union in the Second World War.

Bibliography

Б. В. Соколов Булгаков. Энциклопедия. Алгоритм, 2003. 
Б. В. Соколов Вторая мировая. Факты и версии 
Б. В. Соколов Оккупация. Правда и мифы Moscow, AST, 2002. online version
Третий Рейх. Мифы и действительность Эксмо, Яуза, 2005
Б.В. Соколов Правда о Великой Отечественной войне (Сборник статей). – СПб.: Алетейя, 1999 (online text)
Соколов Б.В. Неизвестный Жуков: портрет без ретуши в зеркале эпохи. (Unknown Zhukov by B.V. Sokolov) – Мн.: Родиола-плюс, 2000 – 608 с. («Мир в войнах»). . (online text)
Б. В. Соколов. Михаил Булгаков: Загадки судьбы. Москва: Вагриус, 2008.
Б. В. Соколов. Михаил Булгаков: Загадки творчества. Москва: Вагриус, 2008.
Б.В. Соколов. Тухачевский. Москва: Молодая гвардия, 2008.
Sokolov, B.V.: World War II Revisited: Did Stalin Intend to Attack Hitler?- In: Journal of Slavic Military Studies 11 (1998), H. 2, p. 113–141
B.V. Sokolov. How to Calculate Human Losses during the Second World War  // Journal of Slavic Military Studies, 2009, September,  Vol. 22, pp. 437–458
Б. В. Соколов.  Врангель. — М.: Молодая гвардия, 2009—512 с ("Жизнь замечательных людей")
Б.В. Соколов Рокоссовский. — М.: Молодая гвардия, 2010—560 с ("Жизнь замечательных людей")
Б.В. Соколов. Кто воевал числом, а кто - умением. М.: Яуза-пресс, 2011-288 с. 
Б.В. Соколов. Россия и СССР на бойне. Людские потери в войнах XX века. М.: Яуза-пресс, 2013-448 с. 
Sokolov Boris V. The Role of the Soviet Union in the Second World War: A Re-examination (Helion Studies in Military History #14). London: Helion Publishers, 2013. 148 p. 
Sokolov Boris V. Marshal K.K. Rokossovsky: The Red Army's Gentleman Commander. London: Helion Publishers, 2015.496 p. 
Sokolov Boris V. Myths and Legends of the Eastern Front: Reassessing the Great Patriotic War. Transl by  Richard W Harrison Barnsley South Yorkshire: Pen & Sword Military, 2019. 400 p. 
Б.В. Соколов. Людские потери России и СССР в войнах XX-XXI вв. М.: Новый хронограф, 2022. 768 с. ISBN 9785948815183

References

External links
Books by B.V.Sokolov (in Russian)

20th-century Russian historians
Living people
Year of birth missing (living people)
Academic staff of Russian State Social University
21st-century Russian historians